Sir Barry Bowen Municipal Airport (formerly Belize City Municipal Airport)  is an airport serving Belize City, Belize. It is only one mile from the city center, and is more centrally located to the city than is Belize City International Airport. It mostly provides travel to Belize's cayes, allowing faster passage to the cayes than by boat or water taxi. The airport is named after the late Belizean politician and entrepreneur Barry Bowen.

The head office of Maya Island Air is on the airport. Tropic Air also has a terminal at this airport with multiple flights every day.

Facilities
In 2012, a project to upgrade and modernize the airport was initiated. Improvements included extending the runway, constructing a new access road, adding a taxiway, and installing a new lighting system. The project was completed in November 2016 at a total cost of BZ$17 million.

Airlines and destinations

Shuttles
Belize Shuttles and Private Transfers provides regularly scheduled shuttles from the airport to Placencia, San Ignacio, Hopkins, and water taxi terminals.

See also

Transport in Belize
List of airports in Belize

References

External links
OurAirports - Belize City Municipal Airport

Transportation in Belize City - Fodors

Airports in Belize
Belize City